Sigfried Piscator, O.P. (1411–1473) was a Roman Catholic prelate who served as Auxiliary Bishop of Mainz (1446–1455 and 1462–1473); and Titular Bishop of Cyrene (1446–1473).

Biography
Sigfried Piscator was born in Mainz, Germany in 1411 and ordained a priest in the Order of Preachers. On 7 Mar 1446, he was appointed during the papacy of Pope Eugene IV as Auxiliary Bishop of Mainz and Titular Bishop of Cyrene. He resigned in Sep 1455. On 27 Mar 1462, he was again appointed as Auxiliary Bishop of Mainz during the papacy of Pope Pius II where he served until his death on 16 Oct 1473.

References

External links and additional sources
 (for Chronology of Bishops) 
 (for Chronology of Bishops)  
 (for Chronology of Bishops) 
 (for Chronology of Bishops)  

15th-century German Roman Catholic bishops
Bishops appointed by Pope Eugene IV
Bishops appointed by Pope Pius II
1411 births
1473 deaths
Dominican bishops
Clergy from Mainz